The 2016–17 California Golden Bears men's basketball team represented the University of California, Berkeley in the 2016–17 NCAA Division I men's basketball season. This was Cuonzo Martin's third year as head coach at California. The Golden Bears played their home games at Haas Pavilion as members of the Pac-12 Conference. They finished the season 21–13, 10–8 in Pac-12 play to finish in a tie for fifth place. They defeated Oregon State and Utah in Pac-12 tournament to advance to the semifinals where they lost to Oregon. They were one of the last four teams not selected for the NCAA tournament and thus received a No. 1 seed in the National Invitation Tournament where they lost in the first round to Cal State Bakersfield.

On March 15, head coach Cuonzo Martin resigned to become the head coach at Missouri. He finished at Cal with a three-year record of 62–39. On March 24, Cal promoted assistant coach Wyking Jones to head coach.

Previous season
The Golden Bears finished the 2015–16 season with a record of 23–11, 12–6 in Pac-12 play to finish in a tie for third place. They defeated Oregon State in the quarterfinals of the Pac-12 tournament to advance to the semifinals where they lost to Utah. They received an at-large bid to the NCAA tournament where they lost in the first round to Hawaii.

Off-season

Departures

Incoming transfers

2016 recruiting class

Roster

Schedule and results

|-
!colspan=12 style="background:#; color:#;"| Exhibition

|-
!colspan=12 style="background:#; color:#;"| Non-conference regular season

|-
!colspan=12 style="background:#;"| Pac-12 regular season

|-
!colspan=12 style="background:#;"| Pac-12 tournament

|-
!colspan=12 style="background:#;"| NIT

Ranking movement

Notes
 March 24, 2017 – Wyking Jones was named the team's head coach

References

California Golden Bears men's basketball seasons
California
California
California Golden
California Golden